Military Outdoor is a private limited company launched on 5 May 2013 and later incorporated on 13 May 2015 by Miss Malgorzata Karolina Kadamus. Military Outdoor is an E-Commerce platform based in Histon, Cambridge which specialises in the sale of military gear aimed at military contractors, security professionals and outdoor enthusiasts. Although owned by Miss Kadamus, the day-to-day operations of the website are managed by Director Justin Jones, a security consultant and (SIA) security industry authority.

Military Outdoor have been featured in a number of publications and media includes an interview with Justin Jones for ITV in January 2015 regarding security vests and body armour.

References

2015 establishments in the United Kingdom
Companies based in Cambridge